Administrative Council elections were held in Dahomey in 1936.

Electoral system
Three members of the Administrative Council were elected from single-member constituencies; Abomey, Ouidah and Porto-Novo. However, the franchise was extremely restricted.

Campaign
Abomey councillor Richard Johnson opted to contest the Ouidah seat.

Results
In a reversal of the 1934 elections, La Voix candidate Casimir d'Almeida defeated the incumbent Augustin Nicoué in Porto-Novo.

References

1936 elections in Africa
1936
1936 in French Dahomey
1936